WMDD (1480 AM) is a radio station licensed to serve Fajardo, Puerto Rico.  The station is owned by Pan Caribbean Broadcasting de P.R., Inc. It airs a Spanish Tropical & news-talk format.

The station was assigned the WMDD call letters by the Federal Communications Commission on November 26, 1947.

Translator stations

References

External links

Fajardo, Puerto Rico
MDD
Radio stations established in 1947
1947 establishments in Puerto Rico